Gavin Christopher Tennille (born October 19, 1984), known as Quelle Chris, is an American record producer, rapper and songwriter from Detroit, Michigan. He has released over 15 albums as a solo act and with his collaborative projects. He has been described as a student of Detroit hip hop.

Career
Tennille was born in Johnson City, New York to a shoe designer.

Tennille's career began expanding as he joined Wasted Youth and attracted the attention of hip hop recording artists in Detroit such as J Dilla and Proof. He later formed a musical group with Denmark Vessey called Crown Nation and soon began using the pseudonyms Q-Life and Quelle, the latter of which means "source" in German. With credit as a songwriter on several songs on Danny Brown's early albums, he began working on a solo career.

His debut studio album, Shotgun & Sleek Rifle, was released in 2011, featuring guest appearances from artists such as Brown, Roc Marciano and Big Tone. He signed with Mello Music Group after releasing two extended plays with the music group Racehorses are Resources, which also consisted of poet John Sinclair. With two studio albums Niggas Is Men and Ghost at the Finish Line released on the label in 2013, Tennille produced for musicians such as Pharoahe Monch, Diamond District and Open Mike Eagle.

His fourth studio album Innocent Country was released in 2015, followed by the 2016 instrumental album Lullabies for the Broken Brain. His fifth studio album Being You Is Great, I Wish I Could Be You More Often was released in 2017. He described the album as "about being human. Being great, being flawed, being you". His debut collaborative album titled Everything's Fine with his life partner Jean Grae was released on March 30, 2018, via Mello. On March 29, 2019, Tennille released his acclaimed sixth solo album Guns. On March 16, 2020, Tennille released his seventh solo album Innocent Country 2 and released it on April 24. It features guest appearances from Earl Sweatshirt, billy woods, Tune-Yards’ Merrill Garbus, Denmark Vessey, Homeboy Sandman, Pink Siifu, and Josh Gondelman. Tennille returned with his seventh album, Deathfame on May 13, 2022. The 14-track album was primarily produced by himself.

Personal life
In December 2017, he proposed to his longtime partner who is also his frequent collaborator, Jean Grae. The two married on August 5, 2018.

Discography

Studio albums

Collaborative albums

Instrumental albums

Mixtapes

References

1984 births
Living people
Record producers from New York (state)
Rappers from New York (state)
Mello Music Group artists
21st-century American rappers